Joan A. Lambert (born July 13, 1946) is an American politician. She was elected as a Republican to the Nevada State Assembly in 1985 and served in seven regular and one special session until 1997, representing part of Washoe County.

She was born in Santa Rosa, California where she received her elementary and high school education. She attended University of California, Davis where she received a B.A. in Economics.

Joan is married and they have two sons.

References 

1946 births
Living people
20th-century American women politicians
University of California, Davis alumni
Members of the Nevada Assembly
20th-century American politicians
Women state legislators in Nevada
21st-century American women